During the five years 1928 to 1932, Herbert Sutcliffe played throughout the period for Yorkshire, continuing his highly successful opening partnership with Percy Holmes which reached its peak of achievement in 1932 when they set a then world record partnership for any wicket of 555, the stand including Sutcliffe's career highest score of 313. For England in Test cricket, Sutcliffe made his only tour of South Africa in 1927–28 and his second tour of Australia in 1928–29, during which he played arguably the greatest innings of his career. In the winter of 1930–31, he and Jack Hobbs went on a private tour of India and Ceylon which has caused some controversy in terms of their career statistics. Sutcliffe opened the innings for England throughout the period, playing in home series each season but most notably against Australia in 1930.

Sutcliffe made 181 first-class appearances with 254 innings in which he was not out 36 times, scoring 15,529 runs for a total average of 70.35.

1927–28 MCC tour of South Africa
On the 1927–28 tour of South Africa, Sutcliffe's only tour of that country, he played in 14 matches and scored 1,030 runs at 51.50 with 2 centuries and a highest score of 102. He was able to open the England innings with Holmes, Hobbs having declined the tour, and made his score of 102 in the first innings of the First Test at the Old Wanderers ground in Johannesburg, England winning by 10 wickets. In the Second Test at Newlands in Cape Town, Holmes and Sutcliffe shared 140 for the first wicket in the second innings, Holmes scoring 88 and Sutcliffe 99. England won by 87 runs. Sutcliffe was the first England batsman ever to be dismissed for 99 in a Test innings. After the Third Test was drawn, South Africa recovered well to square the series with wins in the Fourth and Fifth Tests.

1928 English cricket season
In 1928, Sutcliffe scored 3,000 runs in a season for the first time, a feat he repeated in 1931 and 1932, becoming the first player to achieve it three times. Only Patsy Hendren and Wally Hammond have equalled the feat. Sutcliffe's 1928 tally was 3,002 at 76.97 with a highest score of 228 among 13 centuries and 13 half-centuries. It was not enough to help Yorkshire regain the championship as, although they were unbeaten, too many drawn games meant they finished 4th behind Lancashire.

It was a time for change in the Yorkshire team. William Worsley had replaced Lupton as captain and Arthur Wood had replaced Dolphin as wicket-keeper. Abe Waddington had also retired and his replacement was nominally fast bowler Frank Dennis, although Yorkshire often included Wilf Barber as an extra batsman. Tragically, Yorkshire also lost Roy Kilner who died in April. Arthur Mitchell now came into the team on a regular basis. Sutcliffe was becoming one of the more senior players but he still had several stalwart colleagues in Holmes, Oldroyd, Leyland, Rhodes, Robinson and Macaulay.

Sutcliffe played in all three Tests against West Indies in 1928. This was West Indies' inaugural Test series and their batsmen struggled against a strong England attack so that England was able to win all three Tests by an innings. But Sutcliffe was very impressed by the fast bowling of Learie Constantine, George Francis and Herman Griffith and said of them during the Lord's Test that he had "never played finer fast bowling". In the First Test at Lord's, England won by an innings and 58 runs; Sutcliffe opened with Charlie Hallows and made 48. In the Second Test at Old Trafford, England won by an innings and 30 runs; Sutcliffe opened with Hobbs, who had recovered from an injury, and made 54 in a first wicket partnership of 119. In the Third Test at The Oval, England won by an innings and 71 runs; Sutcliffe and Hobbs put on 155 before Sutcliffe was out for 63, while Hobbs went on to make 159.

1928–29 MCC tour of Australia

Under the leadership of Percy Chapman, Sutcliffe toured Australia again in 1928–29 with Hobbs as his opening partner. Although they both did well and produced one of their most memorable partnerships in the Third Test, they were overshadowed by Wally Hammond who scored a record 1,553 runs at 91.35 in just 13 tour matches with 7 centuries and a highest score of 251. In contrast, Hobbs and Sutcliffe scored 2 centuries apiece and neither accomplished 1,000 tour runs.

England won the first two Tests before Hobbs and Sutcliffe played major roles in one of the most famous Test matches ever at Melbourne. The First Test at the Brisbane Exhibition Ground began with Hobbs and Sutcliffe putting on 85. Sutcliffe was dismissed for 38 and Hobbs soon followed him. Having reached 217–5, England looked set to record a modest total but then Patsy Hendren, playing perhaps his greatest Test innings of 169, held things together and England reached 521. Hendren shared an 8th wicket partnership of 124 with pace bowler Harold Larwood who then won the match for England by taking 8 wickets and 4 catches. In the England second innings, Hobbs and Sutcliffe put on only 25 and Sutcliffe scored 32. England's team at this time has been called its best ever but, ominously, the match featured the Test debut of Don Bradman, though he could only make 18 and 1 as England won by the massive margin of 675 runs. In the Second Test at Sydney, England won by 8 wickets after a brilliant innings of 251 by Hammond and fine bowling by Larwood, Maurice Tate and George Geary. Hobbs (40) and Sutcliffe (11) began with 37 but were not called upon in the second innings as Chapman sent in his tailenders to get the 16 runs needed to win.

The Third Test at Melbourne saw Australia win the toss and bat first. They made 397 thanks to centuries by Alan Kippax and Jack Ryder. England scored 417 with 200 by Hammond and 58 by Sutcliffe. Australia then scored 351 with 107 by their captain Bill Woodfull and a maiden Test century by Bradman. This left England needing 332 to win. Australia had ended the 5th day (it was a timeless match) on 347–8 and the pitch was showing increasing signs of wear. Overnight, a storm broke and soaked the pitch which, as the sun shone on it through the morning, became what Bradman later described as "the worst sticky I ever saw". The Melbourne pitch was "infamous as the worst in the world after rain and under a hot sun". Even Wisden admitted that it "may fittingly be described as a beastly wicket".

Play on the sixth day did not begin until 12:51 and Australia's last two wickets quickly fell with just 4 runs added to their overnight total. Clem Hill reckoned that the state of the pitch was such that "odds of ten to one against an England success would be generous" and Hugh Trumble reportedly told Jack Hobbs that 70 would be a good total. Wisden recorded that "then it was that the wonderful skill of these two (Hobbs and Sutcliffe) showed itself so prominently for, with the ball turning and getting up almost straight, they put on 105 for the first wicket... the two batsmen rendered England splendid service by an historic stand and made victory probable". Having survived the last 5 minutes before lunch, they added 75 in the afternoon session when "the ball was turning and at other times getting up almost straight". Hobbs had nearly been dismissed early on when a catch was dropped but the two batsmen played with "remarkable footwork, masterly defence and unerring skill in a difficult situation". Hobbs was out when the score had reached 105 and then Sutcliffe added another 94 in partnership with Douglas Jardine as the wicket eased and close of play was safely reached with the total at 171–1 (Sutcliffe 83 not out). Next morning, with conditions much more favourable, Sutcliffe batted on until he was finally out for 135 with the total on 318–4 and only 14 more needed. There was a slight scare as three more wickets fell, including Chapman who was caught at cover when trying for the winning hit. But the runs were obtained and England had won a famous victory against the odds by 3 wickets. Sutcliffe later said that he considered this to have been his finest innings ever. Jardine later wrote about the number of times Hobbs and Sutcliffe were hit "all over the body" during their stand and made the point that, if a batsman is to make runs on an Australian sticky wicket, then being hit by the ball is inevitable.

England's victory in the Third Test also secured the series and meant that the team had retained the Ashes. England won the Fourth Test at Adelaide Oval by 12 runs after Hobbs (74) and Sutcliffe (64) began the match with a stand of 143 before both were out on the same total. They both failed in the second innings but another big century by Hammond was enough to ensure the England victory.

Sutcliffe missed the Fifth Test at Melbourne and England lost by 5 wickets. He finished the series with an aggregate of 355 at an average of 50.71 runs in four Tests, while his overall first-class aggregate on the tour was 852 runs at 53.25 with 2 centuries, the historic 135 at Melbourne being his highest score.

1929 English cricket season
In 1929, Sutcliffe scored 5 centuries against the South African tourists. The first was 113 for Yorkshire in a drawn match at Bramall Lane. He then scored four in the Test series, including two in the same match in the Fifth Test at The Oval. In the First Test at Edgbaston, Sutcliffe opened the innings with debutant Tom Killick, sharing stands of 59 and 34 in a drawn match. Sutcliffe scored 26 and 114. In the second innings, he and Hammond (138 not out) added 221 for the 2nd wicket. The Second Test at Lord's was also drawn. Sutcliffe scored 100 in the first innings after Killick had been dismissed cheaply but only 10 in the second. England were in a strong position at the end with South Africa struggling on 90–5, chasing a target of 293. England won the Third Test at Headingley by 5 wickets. Sutcliffe opened with Ted Bowley and scored 37 and 4. England won the Fourth Test at Old Trafford by an innings and 32 runs but Sutcliffe and Bowley were both out cheaply and a 3rd wicket partnership of 245 by Bob Wyatt and Frank Woolley enabled England to recover from 36–2 to 281–3.

Sutcliffe enjoyed one of his greatest Test matches at The Oval where he scored a century in each innings with 104 and 109 not out. He opened with Hobbs again and their partnerships were worth 38 and 77. In the second innings, Sutcliffe and Hammond (101 not out) added 187 for the 2nd wicket. The match was drawn and England won the series 2–0.

Sutcliffe's 1929 season aggregate was 2,189 runs at 52.11 with 9 centuries and a highest score of 150 against Northamptonshire. Yorkshire finished 3rd in the County Championship behind Nottinghamshire and Lancashire after these three teams had taken part in a keen contest which was decided when Lancashire and Yorkshire both lost vital matches in August. The team was unchanged from the 1928 season except that Dennis played more often. Bill Bowes made his championship debut.

1930 English cricket season
In 1930, Sutcliffe was the leading Englishman in the first-class batting averages behind Don Bradman (i.e., of batsmen with 10 completed innings). In a summer of hot, thundery weather that produced some exceptionally bad pitches, Sutcliffe averaged 87.61 in the four Tests he played in, scoring 161 in the Fifth Test at The Oval. He missed the Second Test due to a thumb injury sustained in the First Test.

In a series dominated by Bradman, England began very well and won the First Test at Trent Bridge by 93 runs. Hobbs and Sutcliffe began with a stand of 53 before Sutcliffe was out for 29. England scored 270 and then dismissed Australia for only 144. In the second innings, Hobbs and Sutcliffe put on 125 before Hobbs was out for 78. Sutcliffe and Hammond took the score on to 134 when Sutcliffe, who had scored 58, was hit on the right thumb which split very badly and forced him to retire from the match. A mini-collapse followed but then Hendren, who scored 72, galvanised the innings and England ended with 302, setting Australia a target of 429. Despite Bradman's first century (131) of the series, Australia was all out for 335. Sutcliffe's injury kept him out of the Second Test at Lord's and he could only look on as Bradman scored 254 to lead Australia to a 7 wicket victory.

Sutcliffe returned for the Third Test at Headingley which is memorable for Bradman's astonishing performance in scoring a then-record 334 in the first innings with 309 on the first day alone. Although he received solid support from Woodfull and Kippax, Australia's total of 566 was comparatively low given that it included an individual score of 334. Hobbs and Sutcliffe began England's response with 53 before Hobbs was dismissed for 29 and Sutcliffe not long afterwards for 32. Thanks to a century by Hammond, England reached 391 but, 175 behind, were forced to follow on. Rain now took a hand and the last two days were ruined, England eventually concluding at 95–3 with Sutcliffe 28 not out. The weather ruined the Fourth Test at Manchester too. Australia won the toss and batted first, scoring 345. England had made 251–8 when the match ended. In what was Jack Hobbs' penultimate Test, he and Sutcliffe shared their final century partnership for England, putting on 108 before Hobbs was out for 31. Sutcliffe soon followed, having scored a patient 74 out of 115–2.

The Fifth Test at The Oval saw Sutcliffe at his best as he scored 161 in the first innings, the same score he had made on the famous sticky wicket in the corresponding match in 1926. Wisden recorded that he "brought off some splendid hits to square-leg and to the on, while his off-driving was admirable (and) he did not give a chance". Sutcliffe's innings was the mainstay in a total of 405 which looked a good score given that this was a series decider, but Bradman struck again with a superb 232 and, well-supported by Bill Ponsford, he led Australia to a formidable total of 695. Sutcliffe tried hard in the second innings and made a fighting 54 but to no avail as his team were all out for 251. Australia won the match by an innings and 39 runs and recovered The Ashes by a 2–1 series margin.

Sutcliffe's first-class aggregate in 1930 was 2,312 runs at 64.22 with 6 centuries and a highest score of 173 against Sussex. Yorkshire finished third in the County Championship behind Lancashire and Gloucestershire. Alan Barber replaced Worsley as Yorkshire's amateur captain but played for one season only. Of greater significance was the retirement of the man who many saw as the true Yorkshire captain, Wilfred Rhodes. But one legend was replaced by another as Hedley Verity immediately stepped into Rhodes' boots, making 10 championship appearances and taking 52 wickets. Sutcliffe made only 13 appearances in the championship as a result of Test calls and his thumb injury. The team in 1930 lacked balance with a lot of changes taking place but a typical line-up was Sutcliffe, Holmes, Leyland, Oldroyd, Mitchell, Robinson, Wood, Rhodes or Verity, Alan Barber, Macaulay and Bowes. The likes of Wilf Barber, Frank Dennis and future captain Frank Greenwood made occasional appearances.

1930–31 visit to India and Ceylon
During the winter of 1930–31, Hobbs and Sutcliffe went on a private tour of India and Ceylon that was organised by the Maharajkumar of Vizianagram (popularly known as "Vizzy"). There is debate in some quarters about the status of matches played on this tour, which are not recognised as first-class by Wisden in contrast to certain other publications. The scores were printed in The Cricketer Spring Annual in 1932 and presented as first-class but escaped general notice at the time and were largely ignored until some statisticians took an interest in them in the 1970s. It is known that neither Hobbs nor Sutcliffe thought they were first-class matches; they regarded them as exhibition games arranged for Vizzy's personal entertainment. Nevertheless, Sutcliffe scored 532 runs and 2 centuries in the disputed matches and this has impacted his first-class statistical record with two versions in circulation.

Sutcliffe went to India and Ceylon having declined to join the concurrent MCC tour of South Africa. England lost that series 1–0 and Wisden bemoaned his absence: "The absence of the famous Yorkshireman became a very serious matter when Andy Sandham, after scoring 72 and 6 in the opening games, met with a motor accident which prevented him from playing any more during the whole course of the tour". As a result of the series defeat in South Africa, England replaced Percy Chapman with Douglas Jardine as team captain.

1931 English cricket season
New Zealand toured England in the "wet and cheerless summer" of 1931 and lost the Second Test to England by an innings, the other two being drawn because of bad weather. Sutcliffe played in the Second and Third Tests at The Oval and Old Trafford respectively and had just two innings, scoring 117 and 109 not out. Jack Hobbs had retired from Test cricket and Sutcliffe had two opening partners, Fred Bakewell and Eddie Paynter, the latter not normally an opening batsman.

In all first-class cricket in the 1931 season, Sutcliffe scored four centuries in consecutive innings and averaged 96.96, topping the first-class averages for the first time. He totalled 3,006 runs with a highest score of 230 among 13 centuries. Yorkshire historian J. M. Kilburn commented on Sutcliffe's general consistency as "almost past believing" while Sutcliffe himself reckoned that his accomplishments in 1931, which was a wet summer, were the best of his entire career.

It was a great season for Yorkshire also as they finally won the County Championship for the first time since 1925. Although Wilfred Rhodes had retired, the Yorkshire team, captained by another short-term amateur appointee in Frank Greenwood, still featured Emmott Robinson and had Holmes, Sutcliffe, Leyland, Oldroyd and Mitchell at the top of the batting order, Arthur Wood keeping wicket and match-winning bowlers in Macaulay, Bowes and Verity. Wilf Barber was the main reserve and an interesting debutant was Arthur Booth, 15 seasons before he was finally able to make his mark as another match-winning bowler.

1932 English cricket season
When Yorkshire played Gloucestershire at Park Avenue, Bradford, in July, Sutcliffe completed his 100th century. He was the first Yorkshire player and the seventh overall to achieve the feat. Having scored 83 in the first innings, he reached his target with 132 in the second. Yorkshire won the match by 133 runs. Yorkshire honoured the occasion by presenting Sutcliffe with a cheque for 100 guineas, repeating Surrey's reward paid to Jack Hobbs when he scored his 100th century.

In Yorkshire's match against Essex at Leyton, Holmes and Sutcliffe set a world record partnership for any wicket of 555. This remained the world record for any wicket till 1945–46 and it was not until 1976–77 that it was beaten for the first wicket. It remains the record partnership for any wicket in England. Sutcliffe's share of the stand was 313, his career highest score. Yorkshire batted first and, at the end of the first day, the score stood at 423–0, with Holmes on 180 and Sutcliffe on 231, already beating their previous best stand of 347 against Hampshire in 1920. Bowes and Verity then proceeded to bowl Essex out twice and Yorkshire won by an innings and 313 runs.

When Yorkshire played Essex again at Scarborough, Sutcliffe scored 194 to help Yorkshire to an innings victory, though Bill Bowes was the real matchwinner with 13 wickets. Sutcliffe and Maurice Leyland added 149 for the 4th wicket and, in one six-over period, they scored 102 runs.

Sutcliffe scored 3,336 runs in 1932, the highest season total of his career and it included his highest individual score of 313, made in the world record stand at Leyton. He averaged 74.13 with 14 centuries and 9 half-centuries. He became the third batsman after K. S. Ranjitsinhji and C. B. Fry to score 1,000 runs in a month twice in the same season, making 1,193 in June and 1,006 in August. His total of 3,336 is the sixth highest season aggregate behind Denis Compton (3,816 in 1947), Bill Edrich (3,539 in 1947), Tom Hayward (3,518 in 1906), Len Hutton (3,429 in 1949) and Frank Woolley (3,352 in 1928). His fourteen centuries in the season have been bettered only by Compton (18 in 1947), Jack Hobbs (16 in 1925) and Wally Hammond (15 in 1938).

Largely on account of Sutcliffe's runs and the bowling of Bowes and Verity, Yorkshire were able to win 15 of their last 16 games and retain their County Championship title. Although Frank Greenwood was still the club captain, he only played in 6 championship matches and it was newcomer Brian Sellers who led Yorkshire in most of their matches. Sellers soon became one of Yorkshire's greatest captains. Percy Holmes missed several matches and Sutcliffe sometimes opened with Wilf Barber who now became a first team regular, especially as Edgar Oldroyd had retired. Seam bowler Arthur Rhodes was a regular player in 1932, replacing the retired Emmott Robinson. Bowes and Verity took well over 100 wickets each with Macaulay now playing a supporting role.

Holmes and Sutcliffe had less success when they opened the England innings together in the only Test match of the season, played against India at Lord's. Although England won by 158 runs, they relied heavily on two captain's innings by the soon to be infamous Douglas Jardine who scored 79 and 85 not out as England struggled. Holmes and Sutcliffe both failed twice and this ruined Holmes' chances of touring Australia the following winter.

References

Bibliography
 John Arlott, Arlott on Cricket (ed. David Rayvern Allen), Collins, 1984
 John Arlott, Portrait of the Master, Penguin, 1982
 Barclays World of Cricket, 3rd edition, (ed. E. W. Swanton), Willow Books, 1986. Article on Sutcliffe written by Ian Peebles.
 Derek Birley, A Social History of English Cricket, Aurum, 1999
 Neville Cardus, Close of Play, Sportsmans Book Club edition, 1957, "Sutcliffe and Yorkshire", pp. 1–10
 Bill Frindall, The Wisden Book of Cricket Records, Queen Anne Press, 1986, 
 Alan Gibson, The Cricket Captains of England, Cassell, 1979
 Alan Hill, Herbert Sutcliffe: Cricket Maestro, Stadia, 2007 (2nd edition)
 Douglas Jardine, In Quest of the Ashes, Methuen, 2005
 Ronald Mason, Jack Hobbs, Sportsman's Book Club, 1961
 Pelham Warner, Lords: 1787–1945, Harrap, 1946
 Pelham Warner, Cricket Between Two Wars, Sporting Handbooks, 1946
 Roy Webber, The County Cricket Championship, Sportsman's Book Club, 1958
 Simon Wilde, Number One: The World's Best Batsmen and Bowlers, Gollancz, 1998, 
 Wisden Cricketers' Almanack, various editions from 1920 to 1946
 Graeme Wright, A Wisden Collection, Wisden, 2004

External links
 

English cricket seasons in the 20th century
1928